The men's K-4 1000 metres event was a fours kayaking event conducted as part of the Canoeing at the 1984 Summer Olympics program.

Medalists

Results

Heats
15 crews entered in two heats on August 7. The top three finishers from each of the heats advanced directly to the semifinals while the remaining nine teams were relegated to the repechages.

Repechages
Nine teams competed in two repechages on August 7. The top three finishers from each of the repechages advanced directly to the semifinals.

Italy recorded a time of 48.45 at the 250 m mark which was in fourth, but did not finish.

Semifinals
The top three finishers in each of the semifinals (raced on August 9) advanced to the final.

Final
The final was held on August 11.

References
1984 Summer Olympics official report Volume 2, Part 2. pp. 369–70. 
Sports-reference.com 1984 K-4 1000 m results.

Men's K-4 1000
Men's events at the 1984 Summer Olympics